Ivor Kobina Greenstreet (born 31 May 1966) is a Ghanaian politician and lawyer. He was the Presidential candidate for  the Convention People's Party (CPP) in the 2020 Ghanaian general election.

Early life and education 
Ivor is the third of four siblings born on 31 May 1966 in Accra at the Korle-Bu Teaching Hospital to Prof. Dennis Greenstreet and Miranda Greenstreet, formerly a professor at the University of Ghana and co-chair of the Coalition of Domestic Election Observers. (CODEO)

He is married to the daughter of late former Vice President Kow Arkaah, who is also a lawyer with three children, a son and two daughters.

He is a native of Ga-Mashie in Accra. He had his early education in Ghana and is an enthusiastic Scuba diver, the first African to participate in an international parachuting event, and a member of the Ghana National Rifle Association. He then left for the UK to read law. On completion, he was called to the Middle Temple and Ghana Bar respectively. In 1997, he was involved in an accident on the Tema Motorway which resulted in him using a wheelchair till date.

Early career 
Ivor is a lawyer by profession and a publisher.

He was called to the Ghana Bar and the English Bar (Inner Temple).

Politics 
He is a political militant with the vision of augmenting the rights, freedom and opportunities of the youth, women and the less privileged. He holds in high esteem self - determination, Pan - Africanism  and social justice.

Convention People's Party 
He was an active member of the People's Convention Party (PCP) before the party merged with NCP to form the CPP in 1996. He continued to play various roles in the CPP. In 2004 he was selected by the party as it parliamentary candidate for  Ayawaso West Wuogon constituency to contest in the 2004 Ghanaian general election, which he lost to Akosua Frema Osei-Opare of the NPP. He  was the first  General Secretary to be re-elected twice for the CPP in 2007 and also in 2011. He is an enthusiastic Scuba diver, the first African to participate in an international parachuting event, and a member of the Ghana National Rifle Association (GNRA).

2016 Presidential Bid 
In January 2016, he contested for the Presidential Nomination to represent the CPP and won with a total vote of 1,288 votes, representing 64.2% of valid votes cast while his closest contender Samia Nkrumah, daughter of Ghana's first President Kwame Nkrumah, managed only 579 votes. This victory made him the first physically challenged person to contest for a Presidential election in Ghana. He was the 2016 Ghanaian general election flagbearer for the (CPP). At the end of the election he lost with 25,552 votes representing 0.24 with Nana Akufo-Addo emerging as winner.

2020 Presidential Bid 
He was re-elected as the flagbearer for the Convention People's Party (CPP) for the 2020 general elections. In October 2020 he chose Professor Emmanuel Bobobe to be his running mate

See also
Miranda Greenstreet
Yvonne Greenstreet

References 

Convention People's Party (Ghana) politicians
Living people
Candidates for President of Ghana
1966 births
People from Accra
20th-century Ghanaian lawyers